TPTP (Thousands of Problems for Theorem Provers) is a freely available collection of problems for automated theorem proving. It is used to evaluate the efficacy of automated reasoning algorithms. Problems are expressed in a simple text-based format for first order logic or higher-order logic. TPTP is used as the source of some problems in CASC.

References

External links 

 Web site.

Automated theorem proving